Notable people with the surname Greb include:

 Christin Carmichael Greb, Canadian politician
 Benny Greb (born 1980), prolific German drummer, singer, and clinician
 Charles Greb (1859–1934), business owner and politician
 Gordon Greb (1921–2016), emeritus professor
 Harry Greb (1894–1926), American professional boxer
 Nam Greb, sign of artist Franz Xaver Bergmann

See also 
 Grebo (disambiguation)